Isabella Piccini (born Elisabetta Piccini 1644-1732) was an Italian artist and nun. She worked in the mediums of etching, engraving, and illustration.

Life and work

Piccini was born in Venice in 1644. Her father was etcher and engraver Giacomo Piccini. He trained Piccini in engraving and illustration in the style of the great masters such as Peter Paul Rubens and Titian. Piccini became a Franciscan nun in 1666, joining the Convent of Santa Croce. Upon joining, she changed her name to Sister Isabella.

Prominent Italians commissioned works from her, including portraits and religious artworks. Giovanni Antonio Remondini distributed her prints throughout Europe. All income she made was split between her convent and her family.

Notable collections

Title Page Dittionario Italiano, e Francese Del Signor Veneroni, 1644–1734, Metropolitan Museum of Art

Gallery

References

1664 births
16th-century Venetian women
1732 deaths
17th-century engravers
Franciscan nuns
Italian engravers
Italian etchers
17th-century Italian Roman Catholic religious sisters and nuns
Nuns and art
Republic of Venice artists
Women engravers
Italian women illustrators
Women etchers
Catholic engravers
Female Catholic artists
Catholic etchers